Joyce "Sunny" Mojonnier (born February 17, 1943) is an American politician who served as a California State Assemblywoman for the 75th District. Mojonnier was the 30th women elected to serve in the California Legislature. She served in the California State Assembly for the 75th district from 1982 through 1990.

Career
As a State Assembly Member, Mojonnier Served four, two-year terms as the elected representative to the 375,000 constituents of the 75th Assembly District. She served on the following committees: Rules, Ways & Means, Judiciary, Governmental Organizations, Education, (and Subcommittee on Education Reform), Labor, Economic Development & New Technologies. Established and chaired the Task Force on Child Abuse and the Judicial System. Served as Chairperson of the Joint Committee on Surrogate Parenting and the Subcommittee on Arts & Athletics. She also served as vice chair of the Joint Committee on the 1992 Quincentennial. Also served as a Member of the Select Committee on Genetic Diseases and a member of the Arts, Tourism and Cultural Resources Committee of the National Conference of State Legislatures. Member of the Committee on Suggested State Legislation for the Western Legislative Conference.

Mojonnier successfully authored and carried the Hazardous Medical Waste Management Act which served as the national model for medical waste clean-up. She also successfully authored and carried major mental health legislation that improved patient care, successfully authored and carried Closed Circuit Television Testimony for use in the Courtroom which led to protection of child victims and eliminated the need to transport violent offenders for arraignments, thus limiting escape during transport, successfully authored and carried legislation to require Children's Waiting Rooms at courthouses resulting in the elimination of trauma and victimization of young children in an often unfriendly & threatening circumstance, successfully authored and carried Reflector License Plates and successfully competed for tax dollars needed to safeguard interests of San Diego and the 55miles of California coastline, protecting and improving quality of life in the 75th Assembly District.

Mojonnier was the founder in 1983 of Capitol Network, a network for female legislative and administrative professionals in Sacramento.

In 1990, she was defeated for reelection by San Diego School Board Trustee Dede Alpert.

In 1992, Mojonnier was appointed by Assembly Speaker Willie L. Brown Jr. to serve as Commissioner on the California Medical Assistance Commission. The California Medical Assistance Commission is responsible for negotiating contracts with managed care plans and hospitals, on behalf of the California Department of Health Services for specific services, under the Medicaid program in California (called Medi-Cal). The goal of the Commission is to promote efficient and cost-effective Medi-Cal programs through a system of negotiated contracts fostering competition and maintaining access to quality health care for beneficiaries. She was responsible for review and oversight of approximately 90 of the 275 hospital contracts annually. Performance of these responsibilities resulted in the following: establishment of contracts for services securing quality medical care for medi-cal recipients with approximately 90 hospital providers annually, establish an estimated $1 billion annual savings for the State General Fund, as well as development and implementation of the managed care system.

In 2014, Mojonnier founded a non-partisan, 501.c.3 non-profit foundation to collect the history of the women that have served in the California Legislature. Video-recorded oral histories are being produced and memorabilia is being collected from these female former members of the legislature, with the goal in mind that a museum is in the not so distant future. 2018 is the Centennial of women elected to serve in the California Legislature. Mojonnier served as CEO of WOMEN IN CALIFORNIA POLITICS FOUNDATION & MUSEUM (WICP100) since the beginning, has worked on producing the Centennial Celebration events held on Monday, June 18, 2018 at the California State Capitol and the California State Library Exhibit Halls. WICP100 has been recognized as having the largest collection of Video-recorded oral histories and historical memorabilia on California's female legislators. In late 2020 Mojonnier stepped down as CEO and began to focus on opening the Women In California Politics Foundation Museum. Serving as Chair of the Board of Directors of WICP and Founder/Curator and historian of the WICP Museum she celebrated the Grand Opening event in August, 2021 at 1415 L Street Sacramento, CA 95814.

References

External links
http://www.capitolnetwork.org/

Republican Party members of the California State Assembly
Women state legislators in California
1943 births
Living people
20th-century American politicians
20th-century American women
21st-century American women
20th-century American women politicians